Stinsen Arena is an indoor bandy venue in Nässjö, Sweden. Construction began on 27 April 2012, and the arena was opened on 6 October 2012.

The first game inside the arena was played on 11 October 2012 when Nässjö IF lost, 2–7, to Vetlanda BK.

References

2012 establishments in Sweden
Bandy venues in Sweden
Buildings and structures in Jönköping County
Sport in Jönköping County
Sports venues completed in 2012